Bernadotte Everly Schmitt (19 May 1886 – 23 March 1969) was an American historian who was professor of Modern European History at the University of Chicago from 1924 to 1946.  He is best known for his study of the causes of World War I, in which he emphasized Germany's responsibility and rejected revisionist arguments.

Biography
Schmitt received his Master of Arts from the University of Oxford and his PhD from the University of Wisconsin–Madison. He was permanently hostile to Germany after his first visit there in 1906. In 1916 he gained notice with England and Germany, 1740–1914. His book The Coming of the War, 1914 (published in 1930) won him the 1930 George Louis Beer Prize of the American Historical Association and the 1931 Pulitzer Prize for History.

This work, for which he remains best known, took issue with the equally prominent study of the origins of the First World War published two years earlier by Sidney Fay (for which its author had also won a Beer Prize). In contrast to Fay's argument that Serbia and Russia were culpable, Schmitt insisted that Germany had indeed been largely responsible for the catastrophe. The debate between the "orthodox" school represented by Schmitt, Luigi Albertini and Pierre Renouvin, and the "revisionist" school of Fay, Harry Elmer Barnes and others that shifted blame from the Central Powers to the Allies, dominated scholarship on the "war-guilt" question until the publication of Fritz Fischer's Griff nach der Weltmacht (Germany's Aims in the First World War) (1961), which reopened the debate with a fresh approach by blaming Germany's prewar ambitions.

Schmitt was the first editor of the Journal of Modern History, serving from 1929 to 1946. In 1937 Schmitt published The Annexation of Bosnia, 1908–1909. In November 1941, he called for Germany's population to be reduced from 80 to 50 million.

In 1960, he was President of the American Historical Association. He died in 1969.

Legacy

The American Historical Association offers the Bernadotte E. Schmitt Grants to support research in the history of Europe, Africa, and Asia.

References

Bibliography
 
 Lieber, Keir A. "The new history of World War I and what it means for international relations theory." International Security 32.2 (2007): 155-191. online

Further reading
 Williamson Jr, Samuel R., and Ernest R. May. "An identity of opinion: Historians and July 1914." Journal of Modern History 79.2 (2007): 335-387. online

External links
Guide to the Bernadotte E. Schmitt Papers 1913-1961 at the University of Chicago Special Collections Research Center

1886 births
1969 deaths
20th-century American historians
American male non-fiction writers
Pulitzer Prize for History winners
University of Wisconsin–Madison alumni
University of Chicago faculty
People from Strasburg, Virginia
Alumni of Merton College, Oxford
Historians from Virginia
20th-century American male writers